The 1985 Black & Decker Indoor Championships, also known as the Melbourne Indoor Championships, was an Association of Tennis Professionals men's tournament played on indoor carpet courts at the Festival Hall in Melbourne, Victoria, Australia. It was the fifth and last edition of the tournament, which was part of the 1985 Grand Prix tennis circuit, and was held from 21 October until 27 October 1985. Sixth-seeded Marty Davis won the singles title.

Finals

Singles

 Marty Davis defeated  Paul Annacone, 6–4, 6–4
 It was Davis' 2nd singles title of the year and the 4th of his career.

Doubles
 Brad Drewett /  Matt Mitchell defeated  David Dowlen /  Nduka Odizor, 4–6, 7–6, 6–4

References

External links
 ITF tournament edition details

Black and Decker Indoor Championships
Black and Decker Indoor Championships, 1985
Black and Decker Indoor Championships
Black and Decker Indoor Championships